"Bringing Down the Giant" is a song by American rock band Saving Abel, released as the lead single from their third album Bringing Down the Giant.

Track listing
Digital single
"Bringing Down the Giant" — 3:17

Charts

Release history

References

2011 songs
Saving Abel songs
Songs written by Blair Daly
Songs written by Skidd Mills